Heather Hill may refer to:

 Heather Hill (politician) (born 1960), Australian former politician
 Heather Hill (director), American television director and producer